Lehighton is a mural by the American painter Franz Kline.

In 1946, the Lehighton, Pennsylvania Post of the American Legion commissioned Kline to do a large canvas depicting the town where he had attended high school.  The painting features many of Lehighton's landmarks. The mural was acquired from the American Legion post in 2016 by the Allentown Art Museum in Allentown, Pennsylvania and is today on permanent exhibition there.

Following intensive work on the mural to repair damage from years of exposure to cigarette smoke at the Legion by Luca Bonetti Painting Restoration, the restored painting was unveiled to the public in January 2017.

References

1946 paintings
Murals